Ojos Azules ("Blue Eyes") is a breed of domestic cat.

Origin

Cats with dark blue eyes were discovered in New Mexico among feral cat populations. The first cat, discovered in 1984, was a tortoiseshell named Cornflower. She was bred to males without the trait, which proved to be dominant, as all her kittens showed it. The breed was founded and named Ojos Azules, Spanish for 'Blue Eyes'.

Genes

Ojos Azules are remarkable for their deep blue eyes. Unlike the blue eyes seen linked to the genes in bicolor cats, and cats with point coloration, both of which suppress pigmentation, this gene is not linked to any certain fur color or pattern, giving the opportunity to have cats with dark coats and blue eyes. The depth of color in the eyes is described as being greater even than that seen in a Siamese (cat) and does not cause squinting, deafness or cross-eye. One indicator of the Ojos gene is a flattened tail-tip. Following a genetic investigation by Solveig Pflueger, breeding resumed in a small way with attempts to breed Ojos Azules without the lethal genetic defects.  It was discovered that when the gene is homozygous it causes cranial deformities, white fur, a small curled tail, and stillbirth.  However, when the gene is heterozygous,  those lethal genetic mutations do not manifest.  The result is that breeders must cross the blue-eyed cats with non-blue-eyed cats, assuring a litter of about 50/50 blue/non-blue-eyed kittens.

The blue eye color seen in cats such as the Siamese and the Ojos Azules is due to the same physical phenomenon, the absence of melanin in the iris.  The cause of the absence of pigment differs between Siamese, white cats, and Ojos but the end result is pigment loss and blue eyes.  The depth of color of the blue eyes in Ojos Azules is due to currently unknown polygenetic variations.

Registration and popularity

Ojos Azules are a very rare breed. The first cat of that type was found in 1980. In 1992, only ten were known. The breed, in both short and long hair variety, was accepted for registration by TICA in 1991. The TICA Ojos Azules Breed Group Standard is dated 5 January 2004. Only cats expressing the deep blue eye gene have been called Ojos Azules. It was recently discovered that cranial defects may be linked to the gene, and breeding was temporarily suspended.

Description

Physical characteristics

The medium-sized Ojos Azules is known for its bluish eyes, which are large and round. The neck is arched. The tail is proportionate to the cat's body. The head is somewhat triangular in inscribe. It has a slightly rounded forehead and an angular muzzle. The nose has a slight break. The coat is short, fine, soft, silky, and shiny. The undercoat is not particularly developed, but most are dense in color. All colors are allowed. White markings are common on most extremities (tip of the tail, muzzle, and paws). However, belly spots or chest spots are not acceptable and are considered faults. In particular, they have a white tail tip. Solid white coats are not desirable, as they cannot be distinguished from common white blue-eyed cats. Note that white blue-eyed Ojos Azules are not deaf like most common white blue-eyed cats. In addition, other than cats of the Ojos Azules breed, only white or colorpoint cats can have blue eyes.

Personality
Little is known about this breed, due to its rarity, but some have been known to be active, friendly, and affectionate. They are also easy to groom and do not require much brushing.

References

External links
 Picture of Siamese eye color

Cat breeds
Cat breeds originating in the United States
Experimental cat breeds